Todd Greenberg (born 2 July 1971) is an Australian rugby league administrator who was Chief Executive Officer of the NRL between March 2016 and April 2020.

Background
Greenberg was born in 1971 in Sydney, New South Wales, Australia. He is Jewish. He went to high school at Sydney Tech. His grandfather, Dr Les Greenberg, was the first medical officer to the New South Wales Rugby League.

Career
Greenberg represented Australia in cricket at two editions of the Maccabiah Games, an international multi-sport event for Jewish athletes.

Greenberg completed a sports science degree at the University of New South Wales and a part-time master's degree at University of Technology Sydney.

Between 1993 and 1998 Greenberg worked for Cricket NSW as Events & Promotions Manager. Greenberg joined the NRL club Canterbury-Bankstown Bulldogs in 2001 as Operations and Events Manager. He then left in 2001 to become the General Manager of Stadium Australia. In 2008 he returned to Canterbury-Bankstown, taking on the position CEO, a role he held with the Belmore club until 2013; when he was appointed the Head of Football for the NRL.

In March 2016 Greenberg was appointed Chief Executive Officer of the NRL, succeeding David Smith. Greenberg stepped down as CEO on April 20, 2020.

References

External links

Living people
National Rugby League chief executives
Australian rugby league administrators
Australian Rugby League Commissioners←
University of New South Wales alumni
University of Technology Sydney alumni
Canterbury-Bankstown Bulldogs people
Australian Jews
Maccabiah Games competitors for Australia
Maccabiah Games cricketers
Sportspeople from Sydney
1971 births
Jewish rugby league players